John Thaddeus "Tad" Langlois (born January 25, 1968 in Paterson, New Jersey) is an American former ski jumper who competed in the 1988 Winter Olympics, in the 1992 Winter Olympics, and in the 1994 Winter Olympics.

References

1968 births
Living people
American male ski jumpers
Olympic ski jumpers of the United States
Ski jumpers at the 1988 Winter Olympics
Ski jumpers at the 1992 Winter Olympics
Ski jumpers at the 1994 Winter Olympics